Catherine Brady is an American short story writer.

Life
She graduated from Hollins College with an MA, and from the University of Massachusetts Amherst with an MFA.  
She was on the board, served as Vice-President and President of the Association of Writers & Writing Programs. 
She teaches at the University of San Francisco.

Her work appeared in Other Voices, Kenyon Review, The Missouri Review.

Awards
 2003 Flannery O'Connor Award for Short Fiction
 2000 Western States Book Award in Fiction.

Works

Anthologies

References

External links
"The Rumpus Interview with Catherine Brady", Rumpus, March 9th, 2009
"The Mechanics of Falling by Catherine Brady ", Savvy Verse & Wit, April 24, 2009
"Relieved to Learn That I Could Still Learn: An Interview With Catherine Brady", After the MFA, January 26th, 2007
"Catherine Brady", What Are You Working On? 

Year of birth missing (living people)
Living people
American women short story writers
Hollins University alumni
University of Massachusetts Amherst alumni
University of San Francisco faculty
21st-century American short story writers
21st-century American women writers
American women academics